General elections were held in Grenada on 27 March 1961. Eric Gairy's Grenada United Labour Party won eight of the ten seats, his wife Cynthia Gairy becoming the first woman to be elected to the legislature. George E.D. Clyne of GULP became Chief Minister and served from March to August 1961 when, following the direct intervention of the British government, Gairy's political ban was lifted early, and Clyne resigned allowing Gairy to return in a by-election and become Chief Minister. Voter turnout was 55.5%.

Background
Following the introduction of the new Constitution on 21 December 1959 real authority for governing the country was given to a Chief Minister and those from the majority party in the Legislative Council. Herbert Blaize was appointed the first Chief Minister from 1 January 1960 when the Legislative Council provisions took effect. The Constitution stipulated that at the next election the Legislature would consist of ten elected members and two nominated members. The Queen was represented by an Administrator with reduced powers. Grenada's Administrator at this time was James Lloyd, a Jamaican.

Gairy, the leader of GULP, had been banned from political activity for five years for disrupting an opponent's political meeting on 28 October 1957, by leading a steel band through it. He was not eligible to be a candidate in 1961. Administrator James Lloyd would not raise the ban early.

Results

References

Elections in Grenada
1961 elections in the Caribbean
1961 in Grenada
West Indies Federation
March 1961 events in North America